Dame Rosemary Jean Cramp,  (born 6 May 1929) is a British archaeologist and academic specialising in the Anglo-Saxons. She was the first female professor appointed at Durham University and was Professor of Archaeology from 1971 to 1990. She served as president of the Society of Antiquaries of London from 2001 to 2004.

Early life and education
Cramp was born on 6 May 1929 in Cranoe, Leicestershire, England. She grew up on her father's farm in Leicestershire and was educated at Market Harborough Grammar, a grammar school in Market Harborough, Leicestershire. At age 12, she found evidence of a Roman villa on her family land at Glooston.

Cramp went on to study English language and literature at St Anne's College, Oxford. She graduated with a Bachelor of Arts (BA) degree; as per tradition, her BA was later promoted to Master of Arts (MA Oxon). She remained at St Anne's to complete a postgraduate Bachelor of Letters (BLitt) degree in 1950; her thesis concerned the relevance of archaeological evidence in relation to Old English poetry.

Academic career
Cramp began her academic career at her alma mater, the University of Oxford, where she was a fellow and tutor of English at St Anne's College from 1950 to 1955.

In 1955, she moved to Durham University as a lecturer in archaeology. The Department of Archaeology was formally created the following year, and specialised in Roman and Anglo-Saxon archaeology. She was promoted to senior lecturer in 1966. She became the first female professor at Durham when she was appointed Professor of Archaeology in 1971. She retired in 1990 and was appointed professor emerita. On her retirement, The Rosemary Cramp Fund was established by Durham's Department of Archaeology to recognise individuals and groups who make a significant contribution to the archaeology and heritage of Britain and Ireland.

In 1992, she was a visiting fellow at All Souls College, Oxford.

Outside of her university work, she has held a number of voluntary positions. From 1975 to 1999, she served as a member of the Royal Commission on the Ancient and Historical Monuments of Scotland. She was a trustee of the British Museum between 1978 and 1998. From 1984 to 1989, she was a member of the Historic Buildings and Monuments Commission for England (now known as Historic England). She served as Chairwoman of the Archaeology Data Service from 1996 to 2001.

Cramp has held a number of senior appointments within academic organisations. She was President of the Council for British Archaeology from 1989 to 1992, and has been an Honorary Vice-President since 1992. She was President of the Society for Church Archaeology from 1996 to 2000. From 1992 to 1997, she was Vice-President of the Royal Archaeological Institute. She was president of the Society of Antiquaries of London from 2001 to 2004.

Cramp was a panellist in a 1958 episode of the gameshow Animal, Vegetable, Mineral? held at the Museum of Gloucester, and was an expert guest on a 2007 episode of In Our Time on the life of St. Hilda.

Excavations at Monkwearmouth–Jarrow
From 1963 to 1978, Cramp excavated at Monkwearmouth–Jarrow Abbey, Northumbria, leading the team which discovered remains of the seventh and eighth-century buildings. A final excavation occurred in 1984. At the same time, Cramp was helping to develop and launch the Corpus of Anglo-Saxon Stone Sculpture, published by Durham University.

Prior to the excavations, little was known of the physical buildings beyond Bede's written references. During excavations, some of the earliest stained glass in Britain were discovered; the glass also comprises the largest collection of seventh and eighth-century stained glass in Western Europe. Reflecting on the excavation, Cramp described the moment, saying that the shards of glass "looked like jewels lying on the ground." Cramp's excavations also revealed the later communities on the site, dating from the 11th to the 16th century.

The excavation reports were published in 2005 and 2006 through English Heritage. In 2012, a bid to secure the site World Heritage status was launched, but the application was later suspended. The bid described the importance of the site, noting "its direct association with Bede, Biscop and Bede's teacher Ceolfrith makes it one of the most influential monastic sites in Europe."

Honours
On 8 January 1959, Cramp was elected Fellow of the Society of Antiquaries of London (FSA).  In 2006, she was elected Fellow of the British Academy (FBA). In 2008, she was awarded the Gold Medal of the Society of Antiquaries of London; it is awarded "for distinguished services to archaeology".

In 1987, Cramp was appointed a Commander of the Order of the British Empire (CBE). In the 2011 Queen's Birthday Honours, she was promoted to Dame Commander of the Order of the British Empire (DBE) 'for services to scholarship'.

She has been awarded a number of honorary degrees. She was awarded Honorary Doctor of Science degrees by Durham University in 1995, by the University of Bradford in July 2002, and the University of Cambridge in 2019. She was awarded Honorary Doctor of Letters degrees by University College Cork in June 2003 and the University of Leicester in 2004.

A Festschrift was published in Cramp's honour in 2001. It was titled Image and Power in the Archaeology of Early Medieval Britain: Essays in Honour of Rosemary Cramp, and was edited by Helena Hamerow and Arthur MacGregor. Contributors included Nancy Edwards and Martin Carver. A second honorary volume was published in 2008; edited by Catherine Karkov and Helen Damico, Æedificia nova: Studies in Honour of Rosemary Cramp focused on the art, archaeology and literature of Anglo-Saxon England, and included an article by Cramp.

Selected works

References

External links
Rosemary Cramp at the Archaeology Data Service
 Rosemary Cramp at WorldCat Identities

1929 births
British archaeologists
Academics of Durham University
Fellows of St Anne's College, Oxford
People from Harborough District
Alumni of St Anne's College, Oxford
Fellows of the British Academy
Fellows of the Society of Antiquaries of London
Presidents of the Society of Antiquaries of London
Dames Commander of the Order of the British Empire
Living people
British women archaeologists
Cumberland and Westmorland Antiquarian and Archaeological Society
Corresponding Fellows of the Medieval Academy of America
British women historians